Eke is a populated area, a socken (not to be confused with parish), on the Swedish island of Gotland. It comprises the same area as the administrative Eke District, established on 1January 2016.

Geography 
Eke is situated in the southeast part of Gotland. The medieval Eke Church is located in the socken. , Eke Church belongs to Havdhem parish in Sudrets pastorat, along with the churches in Havdhem, Näs, Grötlingbo, Hablingbo and Silte.

History 
The Guding hillfort in Eke was built during the Iron Age.

References

External links 

Objects from Eke at the Digital Museum by Nordic Museum

Populated places in Gotland County